Styliani "Stella" Fouraki (born March 24, 1994) is a Greek professional basketball player who plays for Olympiacos in the Greek Women's Basketball League.

References

External links 
 FIBA profile
 Eurobasket.com profile

Living people
Greek women's basketball players
Olympiacos Women's Basketball players
1994 births
Forwards (basketball)